Jessica Cristina Barboza Schmidt (born in Maracaibo, Venezuela on 14 August 1987) is a Venezuelan model and beauty pageant titleholder who won the titles of Miss Earth Venezuela 2009 and Miss International Venezuela 2010.

Sambil Model / Miss Earth Venezuela
Barboza won in 2009 the Sambil Model / Miss Earth Venezuela title in a pageant held in Margarita Island, Venezuela on June 12, 2009. She was crowned by the outgoing titleholder, María Daniela Torrealba, Sambil Model / Miss Earth Venezuela 2008. She also competed in Miss Earth Venezuela 2006 but didn't place.

Miss Earth
As the official representative of her country to the 2009 Miss Earth pageant held in Boracay, Philippines, on November 22, 2009, Barboza competed against 79 other delegates and was designated 2nd runner-up.

Miss Venezuela
Barboza competed in 2010 as Miss Distrito Capital in her country's national beauty pageant, Miss Venezuela, obtaining the title of Miss International Venezuela on October 28, 2010.

Miss International
She represented Venezuela in the 2011 Miss International pageant in Chengdu, China in November 6, 2011. During the Miss International 2011 final, Jessica Barboza was announced as the 1st Runner-Up.

Personal life
She currently resides in Panama with her husband Federico Pauls, with whom she has three children: Benjamín and twins Olivia and Chloé.

References

External links
Miss Venezuela Official Website
Miss International Official Page
Miss Earth Official Page
Miss Earth / Sambil Model Venezuela Official Website
Miss Venezuela La Nueva Era MB

1987 births
Living people
People from Maracaibo
Venezuelan beauty pageant winners
Miss Earth 2009 contestants
Miss International 2011 delegates
Venezuelan people of German descent